D. S. Adhimoolam was an Indian politician and former Member of the Legislative Assembly of Tamil Nadu. He was elected to the Tamil Nadu legislative assembly as an Independent candidate from Kadayam constituency in 1957 election and as a Swatantra Party D. S. Athimoolam candidate from Cheranmadevi constituency in 1967 election.

References 

Tamil Nadu politicians
Madras MLAs 1957–1962
Tamil Nadu MLAs 1967–1972